Mateusz Czyżycki (born 8 February 1998) is a Polish professional footballer who plays as a midfielder for GKS Tychy.

Club career
On 5 August 2020, he signed a two-year deal with a newly promoted Ekstraklasa side Warta Poznań.

References

External links

1998 births
People from Brzesko
Living people
Polish footballers
Stal Mielec players
Siarka Tarnobrzeg players
Odra Opole players
Warta Poznań players
GKS Tychy players
Association football midfielders
Ekstraklasa players
I liga players
II liga players